Yazbek (alternatively Yazbek, Yasbeck or Yazbeck or Yesbeck) is a Levantine Arabic surname. The word in Arabic  derived from the Ottoman Turkish title بك‎ “Beik” – the designation was exclusively given to rich and powerful families, traditionally applied to the leaders or rulers of various sized areas across the Ottoman Empire

Notable people with the surname include:

Yazbek
Charlotte Yazbek (1919–1989), Mexican sculptor of Lebanese origin 
Darío Yazbek Bernal (born 1990), Mexican actor
David Yazbek (born 1961), American writer, musician, composer, and lyricist
Mauricio Féres Yázbek (Garcés), a.k.a. Mauricio Garcés (1926–1989), Mexican actor
Mohammad Yazbek (born 1950), Lebanese cleric and Hezbollah member
Patrick Yazbek (born 2002), Australian soccer player
Samar Yazbek (born 1970), Syrian writer and journalist
Yusuf Yazbek (1901–1982), Lebanese politician

Yazbeck
Louise Yazbeck (1910–1995), American composer and teacher
Sean Yazbeck, American businessman and reality television personality
Tony Yazbeck (born 1979), American actor, singer, and dancer
Yvonne Yazbeck Haddad, Syrian-American academic

Yasbeck
Amy Yasbeck (born 1962), American film and television actress